Microsphaera diffusa is a plant pathogen. M. diffusa infections on soybeans are referred to as powdery mildew.

Importance:

Powdery mildew of soybeans is an important pathogen and tends to cause epidemics about every 10–15 years in Wisconsin. In 1975 the first epidemic there was observed and several have occurred since. Powdery mildew affects the soybean plants. When 82% of the soybean leaf area is covered by M. diffusa, photosynthetic and transpiration rates are less than half of normal soybeans, thus affecting soybean yield. Different studies have found different amounts of yield reduction due to the powdery mildew. In Illinois, measured yield losses ranged up to 14 percent.   From Iowa studies, measured yield losses were estimated up to 10 bushels per acre. In Wisconsin, the yield loss was up to 5 bushels per acre. And it's important to note that yield loss due to powdery mildew will be greater for soybeans planted late for a region compared to early-planted soybeans.

Environment:

The temperature plays an important role in powdery mildew development. Powdery mildew favors cooler temperatures (65-77 degrees F). Temperatures above 30 degrees C appears to constrain disease development. Rainfall does not appear to affect the disease. But, it has been found that a shorter leaf wetness duration appears to be a driver of the disease. Additionally, low relative humidity is required for disease development.

Management:

Variety selection is a tool that can be used to help combat powdery mildew. It's not entirely effective because no variety of soybean has complete resistance to powdery mildew, but there are definitely some varieties more susceptible than others. Resistance affects initial inoculation of the plant. The currently effective management tools are fungicides. They can be sprayed once powdery mildew is detected and they kill the spores. This affects the dispersal and secondary inoculation of the plant. Some examples of fungicides include Topsin M, Quadris, and Headline, with the last two being less effective. Another management practice is planting date. Early-planted soybeans tend to show less severity of powdery mildew than late-planted soybeans.

References

External links 
 USDA ARS Fungal Database

Fungal plant pathogens and diseases
Microsphaera
Soybean diseases